Fireflies is the second studio album by American post-hardcore band Frodus, released in 1995 through Level Records. The album was initially going to be a glow-in-the-dark 7" single until the band decided to instead release a full-length album because it was "just as cheap". The album was initially released on CD format, limited to 1100 copies. The album was reissued digitally in 2006, remastered and with new artwork and an alternative track-listing. The band's bandcamp page also hosts another reissue of the record, also including unique cover-art and track-listing.

Track listing

Personnel
Shelby Cinca - Vocals, guitar
Jason Hamacher - Drums, backing vocals
Andy Duncan - Bass
Jim Cooper - Bass
Don Zientara - Engineering
Mike Davis - Engineering
Ken Olden - Engineering

References

1995 albums
Frodus albums